Sardar Muhammad Yaqoob Khan Nasar (born January 10, 1947) is a Pakistani politician and current Member of the Senate of Pakistan. He was the Interim president of the Pakistan Muslim League (N) in 2017. He succeeded Nawaz Sharif after his disqualification by the Supreme Court of Pakistan.

He has served as member of the National Assembly of Pakistan from the Loralai constituency and the Provincial President (Balochistan) and Central Vice President of PML (N). He is the chief of the pashtun Nasar tribe, who have many members in Pakistan and he commands a strong influence and respect in his native province of Balochistan.
Sardar Muhammad Yaqoob Khan Nasar has been returning to Parliament regularly since his first electoral win in 1985. He is a close aide of former Prime Minister Nawaz Sharif. He served as a member of Balochistan Provincial Assembly and as Provincial Minister for Irrigation, Development and Public Health from 1985 to 1988, as member of National Assembly and Federal Minister for Environment, Afghan Refugees, State and Frontier Region from 1990 to 1993 and as Senator from 1994 to 1997. He was elected to the National Assembly again in 1997 and served as Minister for Railways from 1997 to 1999.

Personal life
Sardar Muhammad Yaqub Khan Nasar graduated from the University of the Punjab in 1969 and obtained a Masters in Political Science from the University of Balochistan in 1983. He is involved with Agriculture and coal mining as business interests since a young age. He is married and has four sons and six daughters.

Loss as a result of election rigging
In the February 18, 2008 elections, massive election rigging was conducted under the Musharaf's regime, in which case thousands of bogus and unregistered votes were cast in favour of the rival candidate Mr. Israr Tareen representing PMLQ. A political party that was being supported at the time by then President Pervez Musharraf's Government.

There were approximately 35000 unregistered votes cast against Sardar Nasar in that election by Pervez Musharraf's provincial government of the time. After a lengthy Court battle, Baluchistan High Court ordered a recount. Upon  proof of approx. 350000 bogus and illegal votes of the rival candidate, Baluchistan High Court directed the Election Commission of Pakistan to reverse the original decision and declare Sardar Nasar as winner. Sardar Yaqoob Khan Nasar than returned to the National Assembly seat on representing the people of his constituency.

See also
Pakistan Muslim League (N)
Loralai District

References

External links
Pakistan Muslim League Pakistan Muslim League Leadership
Election Pakistan article: Tough fight on two more NA seats in Balochistan
ECP original decision
ECP declares Sardar Yaqoob Khan as winner

Balochistan MPAs 1985–1988
Pakistani MNAs 1997–1999
Pakistan Muslim League (N) politicians
Pashtun people
People from Loralai District
Politicians from Quetta
University of Balochistan alumni
University of the Punjab alumni
Living people
1947 births
Pakistani MNAs 1990–1993
Pakistani senators (14th Parliament)
Presidents of the Pakistan Muslim League (N)